Yabrin is a settlement in Saudi Arabia  south of Riyadh, within the Eastern Region. The closest town is Haradh. The area was an abandoned ancient settlement. In the 1940s it began to be resettled by Bedouins mostly with a Dawasir background.

The economy is agricultural in nature with date orchards and waterwheel irrigation crop circles. The area is located in an area with natural water resources as opposed to the more common, central pivot irrigation projects sustained by desalinated ocean water from the Red Sea or Persian Gulf.

Geography of Saudi Arabia